Kaj Kolah (also Romanized as Kaj Kolāh; also known as Gach Kolāh, Kush Kalekh, and Kūsh Qal‘eh) is a village in Bonab Rural District, in the Central District of Zanjan County, Zanjan Province, Iran. At the 2006 census, its population was 46, in 13 families.

References 

Populated places in Zanjan County